The 2002 congressional elections in Michigan was held on November 5, 2002 to determine who would represent the state of Michigan in the United States House of Representatives. Michigan had fifteen seats in the House, apportioned according to the 2000 United States Census, causing it to lose a seat from the previous election when it had sixteen seats. Representatives are elected for two-year terms.

Overview

References

2002 Michigan elections
2002
Michigan